Becontree Heath (also spelt Beacontree Heath) is an open space in the London Borough of Barking and Dagenham. The name has also been applied to the local area, in particular to the RM8 postal district.

History
Becontree Heath functioned as the ancient meeting place for Becontree hundred, which covered much of what is now East London. In 1465, the hundred lost territory in the east and the meeting place became located on its fringe.<ref name=becontree_victoria>The hundred of Becontree: Introduction', A History of the County of Essex: Volume 5 (1966). Date accessed: 11 January 2008.</ref> When it was still a rural parish, Becontree Heath was a hamlet in Dagenham.

Geography
It is the location of Dagenham Civic Centre, a grade II listed, 1930s art deco building designed by Ernest Berry Webber and the former town hall of Dagenham Borough Council.

It is also the location of the high density Becontree Heath Estate, built by Barking Borough Council from 1966 to 1970.

Crowlands Heath Golf Club can be found there, along with Becontree Heath Leisure Centre.

EducationLocal education is listed on the London Borough of Barking and Dagenham article''.

Transport

Becontree Heath is served by the Becontree Heath Bus Station. The former station served route 150 (towards Chigwell Row) since 19 March 2016 by BRT East London Transit route EL2 (towards Dagenham Dock). The station has been replaced at present by new bus stops along the nearby road while the local council undertakes a construction project involving the building of 170 homes, a pharmacy and a new replacement bus station.

Gallery

References

Areas of London
Parks and open spaces in the London Borough of Barking and Dagenham
Districts of the London Borough of Barking and Dagenham